Domo Records is an independent record label based in Los Angeles, California.

Domo Records was established in 1993 by Eiichi Naito, a record producer, recording engineer, and artist manager. Domo is an abbreviation and romanization of the Japanese expression , which means "thank you very much" in Japanese.

Domo Records first signee was Japanese composer Kitarō, who in 1994 won a Golden Globe for Best Original Score with his soundtrack to the Oliver Stone film Heaven & Earth and in 2001, won a Grammy Award for Best New Age Album for Thinking of You. Kitaro's albums with Domo Records have received sixteen Grammy Award nominations.

The label has been distributed by Narada, Virgin/EMI Records, Fontana Distribution/Universal, Allegro Media Group, and Entertainment One Distribution. The record label's executive team currently includes Eiichi Naito and Dino Malito.

Domo Records has continued to sign and develop other artists including the Yoshida Brothers, Dave Eggar, Seda Bağcan, Kuni Murai, Peas, Tao of Sound, Luna and The Viva Girls.

Artists
Domo Records

A New Revenge
Aco Takenaka
Akasau
Akiko Kosaka
Akiko Moriyako
Agatsuma
Aman Ryusuke Seto
Benedetti & Svoboda
Chuck Barris
Dave Eggar
Dennis Banks
Dino Malito
Ema & Esoh
Fiddle Witch & The Demons Of Doom
Franci
Fumio Miyashita
Han
Harleigh Cole
Hiroki Okano
Horny Toad
Jazz On The Vine
Jean-Francois Maljean
Kitarō
Kotahi Te Wairua
Kuni Murai
Lee Blaske
Luis Perez
Luis Villegas
Luna
Masa Takumi
Michael Vescera
Michel Huygen
Minmi
Nao Watanabe
Nawang Khechog
Neuronium
Nicholas Olate
Ninja Scroll
Olate Dogs 
Peas
Randy Armstrong
Randy Miller (composer)
Ray Obiedo
Rin' 
Sangeeta Kaur
Sapphron Obois
Seda Bağcan
Shinji
Shinji Ebihara
Stableford
Stephen DeRuby
Stephen Small 
Steve Reid 
Susan Mazer and Dallas Smith
Tao Of Sound
The Violet Burning
Uma Silbey
ViVA Girls
Yoshida Brothers
Yukiko Haneda

Daruma Label
Coma*
Jabberloop
M-Swift
Kaoru Ono
Miu-Clips
Michina & Tomo

Kanpai Records
Appogee
Indicia
Little Plastic Pilots
Peas
Prototokyo
Test Shot Starfish
Hoppy Kamiyama & Bill Laswell
The Saboten

Soundtracks
Soong Sisters (2000)
Metropolis (2002)
Confessions Of A Dangerous Mind (2003)
Ninja Scroll (2003)
Steamboy (2005)
Impressions Of The West Lake (2009)
Toyo's Camera (2009)
442 – Extreme Patriots Of WWII (2010)
Forest Of Time (2012)
An Ethics Lesson (2013)
Foulball (2015)

References

External Links 

 Domo Records Releases

Further reading
 Kaplan, Don. "Domo Links With Three Other Labels." Billboard – The International Newsweekly of Music, Video and Home Entertainment v. 110, i. 21 (May 23, 1998): 65, 71.

American independent record labels
Record labels established in 1993
New-age music record labels
World music record labels